Rottach (also: Große Rottach) is a river of Bavaria, Germany. It is a left tributary of the Iller at Kempten.  Note that there is another river also called Rottach 18 kilometres upstream which is a right tributary of the Iller.

See also
List of rivers of Bavaria

References

Rivers of Bavaria
Rivers of Germany